Anaxarcha acuta is a species of praying mantis found in India.

See also
List of mantis genera and species

References

A
Mantodea of Asia
Endemic fauna of India
Insects of India
Insects described in 1963